Andrew Jackson High School is a public high school in Kershaw, South Carolina, United States. It is within the Lancaster County School District.

References

Public high schools in South Carolina
Schools in Lancaster County, South Carolina